Then & Now: The Hits Collection is the second compilation album by American country music artist Tracy Lawrence. It is composed several hits from his previous albums, as well as the newly recorded tracks "Used to the Pain" and "If I Don't Make It Back". Both of these were released as singles, peaking at numbers 35 and 42, respectively, on the country charts.

Content
"Used to the Pain" was previously released by its co-writer, Mark Nesler, on his 1998 debut album I'm Just That Way, and it was a number 45 single for him that year. Bobby Pinson, who co-wrote "If I Don't Make It Back", later recorded it on his 2007 album Songs for Somebody.

Lawrence re-recorded all of the previously released material for this album (except for "Paint Me a Birmingham") because Mercury Nashville Records, the label to which he was signed at the time, did not own the rights to his older material for Atlantic Records. This album is also his only release for Mercury.

Track listing

APreviously unreleased track.

Personnel
Eddie Bayers – drums
Mike Brignardello – bass guitar
Mark Casstevens – harmonica
Dan Dugmore – steel guitar, Dobro
Paul Franklin – steel guitar, Dobro
Aubrey Haynie – fiddle, mandolin
Tony Harrell – piano, keyboards
Wes Hightower – background vocals
Tracy Lawrence – lead vocals
B. James Lowry – acoustic guitar
Liana Manis – background vocals
Brent Mason – electric guitar
Steve Nathan – piano, keyboards
John Wesley Ryles – background vocals
Glenn Worf – bass guitar
Curtis Wright – background vocals
Curtis Young – background vocals

Charts

Weekly charts

Year-end charts

References

2005 greatest hits albums
Tracy Lawrence albums
Albums produced by James Stroud
Mercury Records compilation albums